Azerbaijani culture may refer to:

Regions  
Culture of Azerbaijan

Ethnic groups
Azerbaijanis#Culture
Iranian Azerbaijanis#Culture
Azerbaijanis in Georgia#Culture